Shahrow (also Romanized as Shahroo, Shāhrū, and Shahrū; also known as Maḩalleh-ye Pā’īn-e Shahrū, Maḩalleh-ye Pā’īn Shahrū) is a village in Tazian Rural District, in the Central District of Bandar Abbas County, Hormozgan Province, Iran. At the 2006 census, its population was 1,790, in 369 families.

References 

Populated places in Bandar Abbas County